Nickel(II) titanate is an inorganic compound with the chemical formula NiTiO3  nickel(II) titanate, also known as nickel titanium oxide, is a coordination compound between nickel(II), titanium(IV) and oxide ions. It has the appearance of a yellow powder. There are several methods of synthesis for nickel(II) titanate. The first method involves nickel(II) titanate's melting temperature of over 500 °C at which its precursor decomposes to give nickel(II) titanate as a residue. Nickel(II) titanate has been used as a catalyst for toluene oxidation. The second method involved using enthalpy and entropy on the reaction to synthesize nickel(II) titanate through its phase transition.

Molecular and crystal structure 
Nickel(II) titanate crystallizes at 600 °C and is stable at room temperature and normal pressure in an ilmenite structure with rhombohedral R3 symmetry. Nickel(II) titanate's rhombohedral structure has layers of Ni and Ti alternate along the rhombohedral axis with O layers between them. The XRD data supports nickel(II) titanate's ilmenite structure with its rhombohedral symmetry. Other descriptions of nickel(II) titanite's Illemite structure consists of a pseudo close packed hexagonal array of O2− ions with two thirds occupied by an ordered hexagonal like cation. The Average crystallites size for nickel(II) titanate was estimated at 42 nm with lattice constants of a = 5.032 Å, b = 5.032 Å, c = 4.753 Å. The structure was established by using X-ray power intensities.

Synthesis 
Nickel(II) titanate was synthesized using the polymeric precursor method. This involved spontaneous combustion of Ti(OCH(CH3)2)4 with Ni(NO3)2·6H2O and C3H7NO2 in a molar ratio of 1:1:20 in isopropyl alcohol solution. The product of nickel(II) titanate was calcinated from the precursor at 600 °C for 3 hours.

Nickel(II) titanate was also formed by heating NiO and TiO2 at 1350 °C for three hours. Then it was then cooled until room temperature.

NiO + TiO2 + (heat) →   NiTiO3

Applications 
Due to nickel(II) titanate's brilliant yellow color and high UV-vis-NIR reflectance, it has the potential to serve as a pigment for building coating. Ilmenite-type NiTiO3 are well known as functional inorganic materials with wide application in electronic materials, including electrodes of solid fuel cells, gas sensors, chemical catalysts and so on due to their high static dielectric constants, weak magnetism and semiconductivity. NiTiO3 as a semiconductor has excellent catalytic activity due to its absorption bands. Analysis of the band structures and density of states have implied that nickel(II) titanate has immense potential in the areas of high-density data storage, gas sensor data and integration in circuit devices. NiTiO3 has even been utilized as a catalyst in toluene oxidation. Other applications of nickel(II) titanate have yet to be found.

Interesting facts about compound in History 
MTiO3 (M= Ni, Fe, Mn) compounds have received attention as possible candidates for multiferroic materials capable of magnetization through application of electric field.

Nickel(II) titanate furthermore has many different names such as nickel titanium oxide; nickelous; titanium nickel oxide; nickel titanium trioxide.

Through an experiment to see if NiTiO3 could serve as a catalyst for toluene oxidation in comparison to NiFe2O4, NiTiO3 achieved greater results than its experimental counterpart in oxidating toluene.

A single-source heterobimetallic complex Ni2Ti2(OEt)2(µ-OEt)6(2,4-pentanedionate)4 was synthesized and underwent thermal decomposition at 500 °C to give NiTiO3 residue.

By doping the NiTiO3 with Ga2O3, the anomalous increase of the electrical conductivity is shifted to lower temperatures.

It is used as a yellow pigment.

References

Nickel compounds
Titanates